Michael Palme (1943 in Prague – February 10, 2010, in Wiesbaden) was a German journalist with particular interest in sports.  He also served as a television host and commentator for ZDF for many years.

References

 Journalist mit Leib und Seele - Früherer ZDF-Sportredakteur Michael Palme ist tot, obituary from ZDF.de (in German

1943 births
2010 deaths
German television personalities
German journalists
German male journalists
German male writers
ZDF people